Jachin is an unincorporated community in Choctaw County, Alabama, United States. Jachin had a post office, which opened on March 19, 1892, and closed on February 27, 1993.

References

Unincorporated communities in Choctaw County, Alabama
Unincorporated communities in Alabama